The Oceania Cup is an annual under-16 Australian rules football competition contested by the national teams of the Oceania region of the Pacific. The tournament is held in December each year. The event was first held in 2009. A girls tournament has also been held since at least 2016.

Nations
The following nations have taken part in at least one edition of the competition.
 Fiji
 Nauru
 New Zealand
 Papua New Guinea
 Samoa
 Solomon Islands
 Tonga
 Vanuatu

Results

References

International Australian rules football tournaments
Australian
Recurring sporting events